The Journal of International Affairs is a biannual academic journal covering foreign affairs. It is edited by graduate students at the School of International and Public Affairs at Columbia University. It was established in 1947 as a nonprofit organization. The editor-in-chief is Jiwon Ma.

Editors-in-chief
The following persons are or have been editors-in-chief:

External links

International relations journals
Publications established in 1947
Biannual journals
Academic journals edited by students
Columbia University academic journals